Löwenadler is a Swedish surname. Notable people with the surname include:

Fredrik Löwenadler (1895–1967), Swedish swimmer
Holger Löwenadler (1904–1977), Swedish film actor

Swedish-language surnames